Senator Barela may refer to:

Casimiro Barela (1847–1920), Colorado State Senate
Ted Barela (2000s–2010s), New Mexico State Senate